Konstantin Jakob Türnpu (13 August 1865 Klooga Manor, Harju County – 16 April 1927 Tallinn) was an Estonian composer and conductor.

In 1891, he graduated from Saint Petersburg Conservatory's Organ Department.

1916–1927, he conducted Male Choir of Tallinn Male Song Society.

He was the general conductor of V and VI Song Festival.

In 1969, Türnpu Home Museum was opened in Klooga.

Works

 Kyrie (for male choir)
 Morning of freedom (for male choir)
 Our childhood village lane (for male choir)

References

1865 births
1927 deaths
Estonian composers
Estonian conductors (music)
People from Lääne-Harju Parish
Burials at Metsakalmistu